Waterloo Road is a British television drama series set in a comprehensive school of the same name, first broadcast on BBC One. The show was filmed and set in the English town of Rochdale from series one until the end of series seven, and the Scottish town of Greenock from the beginning of series eight until the end of its original run. The first episode was broadcast on BBC One on 9 March 2006, and the final episode of the original run was broadcast on BBC Three on 9 March 2015.

Waterloo Road ran for 200 episodes and exactly nine years. In September 2021, the show was recommissioned for an eleventh series, with production returning to the Greater Manchester area. The revival series started airing on 3 January 2023. A twelfth series has been commissioned.

Premise 
Waterloo Road is set in a failing comprehensive school of the same name and focuses on both the professional and personal lives of the students and staff.

Ann McManus, the show's cocreator, devised the series in response to the BBC requesting a drama pertinent to "ordinary people in Britain today". She used the programme to explore many topical issues that occur within Britain, applying them to an educational setting.

Production

Development 

The first series contained eight episodes and was first broadcast from 9 March to 27 April 2006 on BBC One. Subsequently, the show was renewed for a second series that was 12 episodes long. This series began on 18 January 2007 and finished on 26 April of the same year. Series 3 was commissioned, consisting of twenty episodes (which would become the normal length of the show's series), and premiered on 11 October 2007 and ending on 13 March 2008. Starting on 7 January 2009, the 4th series consisted of 20 episodes and ended on 20 May. Filming of the 5th series began on 11 May 2009 and began airing on Wednesday 28 October (the previous Sunday for BBC One Scotland). The final episode aired on 15 July 2010. For the first time, the series was recorded in HD.

Production was meant to move locations in 2009, with storylines in the fourth and fifth series designed to coincide with that move. However, these plans did not go ahead, so the show remained in Rochdale until Series 7. The filming of the fifth and sixth series was back-to-back, from 2009 to 2010. The sixth series ran from 1 September 2010 to 6 April 2011.

The seventh series began airing on 4 May 2011 and ended on 25 April 2012. The series lasted for 30 episodes. As part of a BBC initiative to produce more shows out of England, in August 2011 the show was commissioned for fifty episodes, comprising the eighth and ninth series, in a new location in Greenock, Scotland. The Rochdale site was demolished shortly after filming ended in 2011 and is now a housing estate. For most of the eighth series, the school was a non-fee charging independent school, as opposed to a comprehensive school as it was for the first seven series. The eighth series, again 30 episodes long, started on 23 August 2012 and concluded on 4 July 2013. Starting on 5 September the same year, the ninth series ran until 12 March 2014.

Cancellation and return 

On 2 April 2014, the BBC announced that series 10 would be the original show's last. The final scenes were recorded on 22 August 2014. On 11 December, it was announced that the last ten episodes of the show would be aired first on BBC Three, with a repeat on BBC One later in the evening. The final episode was the show's 200th and aired on 9 March 2015, exactly nine years after the first episode. In the story, the school remains open after a lengthy battle against a school merger. In September 2019, the entire series was made available on BBC iPlayer.

On 23 September 2021, it was announced that Waterloo Road would return with a new series on BBC One. The series' production returned to Greater Manchester, with the school set at the former St Ambrose Barlow Roman Catholic High School in Swinton. Filming commenced in February 2022. In November 2022, it was confirmed that the series' seven episodes would air from January 2023.

Following the conclusion of the revival series, cast members Angela Griffin and Kym Marsh confirmed that they were back on the set of the show, with news agencies later confirming that Waterloo Road would be returning later in the year with a second series of the revival.

Casting 

The show utilises an ensemble cast led by the school's staff members. The longest-running cast members were Philip Martin Brown (Grantly Budgen, series 1–9), Jason Done (Tom Clarkson, series 1–8) and Chelsee Healey (Janeece Bryant, series 1–4 and 6–8, 11).

The original teaching characters consisted of Headteacher Jack Rimmer (Jason Merrells); Deputy Headteacher Andrew Treneman (Jamie Glover); Art teacher and Head of Pastoral Care Kim Campbell (Angela Griffin); Head of English Grantly Budgen (Philip Martin Brown); English teachers Lorna Dickey (Camilla Power) and Tom Clarkson (Jason Done); Head of French Steph Haydock (Denise Welch); and Head of Drama Izzie Redpath (Jill Halfpenny). The student characters included Donte Charles (Adam Thomas), Chlo Grainger (Katie Griffiths), Janeece Bryant (Chelsee Healey), Yasmin Deardon (Rhea Bailey), Mika Grainger (Lauren Drummond) and Lewis Seddon (Craig Fitzpatrick).

Series 2 introduced pupil Brett Aspinall (Tom Payne), his father and sponsor governor Roger Aspinall (Nick Sidi) and school secretary Davina Shackleton (Christine Tremarco). Other new pupils included Leigh-Ann Galloway (Holly Matthews).

Series 3 introduced new deputy head Eddie Lawson (Neil Morrissey) and, in the seventh episode, new Headteacher Rachel Mason (Eva Pope). Other staff arrivals include NQT English teacher Jasmine Koreshi (Shabana Bakhsh) and Head of Music and Drama Matt Wilding (Chris Geere). Pupils introduced in the third series include Aleesha Dillon (Lauren Thomas), Danielle Harker (Lucy Dixon), Karla Bentham (Jessica Baglow), Paul Langley (Thomas Milner), Bolton Smilie (Tachia Newall) and Michaela White (Zaraah Abrahams).

Series 4 introduced the Kelly family, consisting of mother Rose Kelly (Elaine Symons) and her five children: Marley (Luke Bailey), Earl (Reece Noi), Sambuca (Holly Kenny), Denzil (Reece Douglas), and baby Prince. The series features new Head of PE Rob Cleaver (Elyes Gabel), who is sacked when it transpires he is giving Bolton pills to help him win an important match. Rachel's sister Melissa Ryan (Katy Carmichael) and nephew Phillip (Dean Smith) are also introduced.

Series 5 introduced Executive Head Max Tyler (Tom Chambers), Deputy Headteacher Chistopher Mead (William Ash), Head of Food Technology Ruby Fry (Elizabeth Berrington), newly-qualified English teacher Helen Hopewell (Vinette Robinson) and Head of Modern Languages Jo Lipsett (Sarah-Jane Potts).  New pupils included Emily James (Shannon Flynn) and her sister Lindsay James (Jenna-Louise Coleman), Siobhan Mailey (Phoebe Dynevor), Ros McCain (Sophie McShera), Luke Pendle (Richie Jeeves), Amy Porter (Ayesha Gwilt), Josh Stevenson (William Rush) and Finn Sharkey (Jack McMullen).

In series 6, Amanda Burton joined the cast as new Headteacher Karen Fisher. Karen's family included children Jess (Linzey Cocker) and Harry (Ceallach Spellman) and her husband and supply teacher harlie (Ian Puleston-Davies). Lucien Laviscount was cast as rebellious teenager Jonah Kirby and Chelsee Healey also reprised her role as Janeece Bryant as the new school secretary. On 21 December 2009, the arrival of new pupils Bex Fisher (Tina O'Brien) and Kyle Stack (George Sampson) was announced; Kyle joined in episode 11. Also introduced in episode 11 were pupils Nate Gurney (Scott Haining), Ronan Burley (Ben-Ryan Davies), Ruth Kirby (Anna Jobarteh). Other additions included Ronan Burley's father (Martin Kemp), Head of Spanish Francesca "Cesca" Monotya (Karen David), Head of Pastoral CareAdanna Lawal (Sharlene Whyte) and Geography teacher and father of Jonah and Ruth, Marcus Kirby (Wil Johnson).

Series 7 introduced new Headteacher Michael Byrne (Alec Newman), science teacher and Deputy Headteacher Sian Diamond (Jaye Jacobs), school site manager Rob Scotcher (Robson Green), maths teacher Daniel Chalk (Mark Benton), new Head of English Linda Radleigh (Sarah Hadland), school benefactor Lorraine Donnagan (Daniela Denby-Ashe) and pupil Jodie "Scout" Allen (Katie McGlynn). Guest stars in the seventh series included: Gemma Atkinson, Dominique Jackson, Alicya Eyo, Margi Clarke, Jodie Prenger, Lisa Riley, Tupele Dorgu, Tracy-Ann Oberman, Kai Owen and Jane Asher.

Series 8 marked the start of Waterloo Road in Greenock, and introduced English teacher Christine Mulgrew (Laurie Brett) and History teacher Audrey McFall (Georgie Glen).

Series 10 introduced an extensive set of new characters, including new headmaster Vaughan Ftizgerald (Neil Pearson), his partner and Art teacher Allie Westbrook (Nicola Stephenson), his ex-wife and Geography teacher Olga Fitzgerald (Pooky Quesnel), and Olga and Vaughan's children Justin Fitzgerald (Max Bowden) and Leo Fitzgerald (Zebb Dempster). Other new staff introductions included Deputy Headteacher Lorna Hutchinson (Laura Aikman), Head of Modern Languages George Windsor (Angus Deayton), GPD Teacher Guy Braxton (Regé-Jean Page), Science teacher Marco D'Olivera (Stefano Braschi). New pupils Kenzie Calhoun (Charlotte Beaumont), Rhiannon Salt (Rebecca Craven), Lenny Brown (Joe Slater), Lisa Brown (Caitlin Gillespie), Darren Hughes (Mark Beswick), Shaznay Montrose (Je'Taime Morgan Hanleyand), Scott Fairchild (Andrew Still), Carrie Norton (Tahirah Sharif), Bonnie Kincaid (Holly Jack), Dale Jackson (Finlay MacMillan) and Abdul Bukhari (Armin Karima).

On 24 January 2022, the BBC revealed that Adam Thomas, Katie Griffiths and Angela Griffin would reprise their roles in the forthcoming series as Donte Charles, Chlo Charles and Kim Campbell respectively, with Campbell now as the Headteacher. On 25 November 2022, the BBC released the names of further cast members including Vincent Jerome (Lindon King), James Baxter (Joe Casey), Jo Coffey (Wendy Whitwell), Shauna Shim (Valerie Chambers), Neil Fitzmaurice (Neil Guthrie), Rachel Leskovac (Coral Walker), Katherine Pearce (Amy Spratt), Kym Marsh (Nicky Walters), Sonia Ibrahim (Jamilah Omar) and Ryan Clayton (Mike Rutherford). Actors playing pupil characters include Adam Abbou (Danny Lewis), Priyasasha Kumari (Samia Choudhry), Noah Valentine (Preston Walters), Adam Ali (Kai Sharif), Alicia Forde (Kelly-Jo Rafferty), Francesco Piacentini-Smith (Dean Weever), Liam Scholes (Noel McManus) and Lucy Eleanor Begg (Caz Williams). Scarlett Thomas plays Izzy Charles and fellow junior student casting includes Summer Violet Bird (Tonya Walters), Ava Flannery (Verity King), Thapelo Ray (Dwanye Jackson), Inathi Rozani (Zayne Jackson), Chiamaka (ChiChi) Ulebor (Shola Aku) and Sahil Ismailkhil (Norrulah Ashimi).

Transmissions and ratings

Episodes

The final episode of series 3 attracted 6 million viewers. The final episode of series 4 and 5 each attracted 4.5 million viewers.

The finale of series 10 aired on 9 March 2015, nine years after the first episode aired on 9 March 2006.

Reception

Revival series

Awards and nominations

International broadcasts

DVD releases
Series one and two were released by 2entertain, while series three to eight were released by Acorn DVD. Series nine and ten were not released on home media.

Online
Full episodes from series 1 to series 8 were previously available to watch on YouTube, but were later replaced by highlights of Waterloo Road. All episodes were made available on BBC iPlayer on 19 September 2019.  The popularity of the original show on iPlayer among younger audiences contributed to the show's recomissioning in 2022.

References

External links

Official website – web archive

Waterloo Road at Shed Media (web archive)

 
2006 British television series debuts
2000s British LGBT-related drama television series
2000s high school television series
2010s British LGBT-related drama television series
2010s high school television series
2020s British LGBT-related drama television series
2020s high school television series
Alcohol abuse in television
BBC Scotland television shows
BBC television dramas
British high school television series
British television series revived after cancellation
Child abuse in television
Domestic violence in television
English-language television shows
Gay-related television shows
Lesbian-related television shows
Murder in television
Rape in television
Television series by Warner Bros. Television Studios
Television shows set in Greater Manchester
Teenage pregnancy in television
Television series about families
Television shows set in Scotland
Youth culture in the United Kingdom
Fictional schools
Television series about teenagers